Micheaux is a French surname.  Notable people with the name include:

Larry Micheaux (born 1960), American basketball player
Nicki Micheaux (born c. 1971), American actress
Oscar Micheaux (1884–1951), American author and film director and producer

See also
 Michaux (disambiguation)

French-language surnames